Estadio Nacional de Panama, also called the Rod Carew National Stadium, is a multi-purpose stadium in Panama City, Panama. The stadium has a capacity of 27,000 and was built in 1999.

It is currently used mostly for baseball matches from the national league, and Panama national baseball team matches.

It has also hosted many international baseball competitions as well as many concerts and different types of events.

In 2012, Qualifiers were held at the stadium for the 2013 World Baseball Classic, featuring the national baseball teams of Panama, Brazil, Colombia, and Nicaragua

The stadium is named after Rod Carew, a Hall-of-Fame Panamanian-American baseball player.

Since 2003, there have been many plans and talks of expanding the stadium's capacity to nearly 45,000.

Some of the artists that have performed in the Estadio Nacional de Panama include  Backstreet Boys, Christina Aguilera, Sting, Enrique Iglesias, Soda Stereo, and Ruben Blades.

The New York Yankees and Miami Marlins scheduled two spring training exhibition games at the ballpark on March 15 and March 16, 2014.

The 2019 Caribbean Series was played at the stadium, coinciding with Panama's first appearance in the tournament since 1960.

References 

Baseball venues in Panama
Panama
Sports venues completed in 1999
Multi-purpose stadiums in Panama
Sports venues in Panama City
1999 establishments in Panama